Sandy Walker (born 1942) is an American artist. His work is included in the collections of the Whitney Museum of American Art and the Smithsonian American Art Museum.

References

1942 births
Living people
20th-century American women artists
20th-century American artists
21st-century American women
Date of birth missing (living people)